Witold Sadowy (7 January 1920 – 15 November 2020) was a Polish film and theatre actor as well as publicist and columnist of the Gazeta Wyborcza daily and Życie na gorąco magazine.

Life and career
He was born on 7 January 1920 in Warsaw. In 1944, during the Warsaw Uprising, he lost his father and brother. He returned to Warsaw with his mother after the Soviets gained control of the city.

He made his theatre debut in 1945 by performing the role of Florian in Maurice Maeterlinck's play Le Bourgmestre de Stilmonde directed by Ryszard Wasilewski. He worked at such Warsaw theatres as  City Drama Theatre (1945, 1946–1949), Polish Theatre (1945–1946; 1949–1951), New Theatre (1951–1953), Młoda Warszawa Theatre (1953–1957), Classic Theatre (1957–1972) and TR Warszawa (1972–1988). He gave his last performance in 1989 by playing the role of Field Marshal in Zygmunt Nowakowski's play The Rosemary Twig.

In the 1980s, he began working as a theatre columnist and publicist in such newspapers as Życie Warszawy, Życie Codzienne, Słowo, Express Wieczorny and the New York-based Nowy Dziennik. Since 1985, he also wrote articles in Gazeta Wyborcza. He published a number of books on theatre and film and came to be known as "the chronicler of Warsaw's theatre life". The Polish Union of Stage Actors (ZASP), awarded him the title of distinguished member as a recognition of his work.

Personal life
In January 2020, at the age of 100, he publicly came out as homosexual in a television reportage by TVP Kultura channel devoted to the celebration of the centenary of his birth. He lived in a relationship with Jan Ryżow, an engineer, from 1942 until Ryżow's death in 1996. In March 2020, his coming out received a considerable national and international attention. He died on 15 November 2020.

Filmography
1946: Zakazane piosenki – violinist
1960: Bad Luck – soldier
1970: Pogoń za Adamem – officer
1973: Wielka miłość Balzaka – Victor Hugo (episode 7)
1978: ... Gdziekolwiek jesteś panie prezydencie
1980: Zamach stanu 
1980: Sherlock Holmes and Doctor Watson – man in a hotel (episode 24)
1980: Punkt widzenia (episode 5)
1981: Przyjaciele (episode 4)

Publications
Teatr za kulisami i na scenie, Oficyna wydawnicza "Rytm”, Warsaw 1995, .
Teatr – plotki, aktorzy, wspomnienia zza kulis, Oficyna wydawnicza "Rytm”, Warsaw 1995, .
Ludzie teatru – mijają lata, zostają wspomnienia, Oficyna wydawnicza "Rytm”, Warsaw 2000.
Czas który minął, Oficyna wydawnicza "Rytm”, Warsaw 2009, .
Przekraczam setkę. Zapis wspomnień 2018-2019, Wydawnictwo ZASP, Warsaw 2020, .

Honours and awards
Medal of the Centenary of Regained Independence, 2020
Commander's Cross of the Order of Polonia Restituta, 2012
Pro Masovia Medal, 2012
Warsaw Feliks Award, 2011
Officers Cross of the Order of Polonia Restituta, 2001
Knight's Cross of the Order of Polonia Restituta, 1987
Medal of the 40th Anniversary of People's Poland, 1986
Golden Cross of Merit, 1979

See also
Cinema of Poland

References

1920 births
2020 deaths
Polish LGBT artists
Gay actors
20th-century Polish male actors
Polish publicists
Polish centenarians
Male actors from Warsaw
Polish male film actors
Polish male stage actors
Men centenarians